Events from the year 2015 in the Czech Republic

Incumbents
 President – Miloš Zeman
 Prime Minister – Bohuslav Sobotka

Events

 24 February – The Uherský Brod shooting
 23 July – Studénka train crash

In popular culture

Sports
31 January – 1 February – The 2015 UCI Cyclo-cross World Championships were hosted in the town of Tábor.
5–8 March – The 2015 European Athletics Indoor Championships were hosted in the city of Prague.
1–3 May – The 2015 Canoe Sprint European Championships were hosted in the village of Račice.
1–17 May – The 2015 IIHF World Championship was hosted in the cities of Prague and Ostrava.
15–30 June – The 2015 UEFA European Under-21 Championship was hosted in the cities of Prague, Olomouc and Uherské Hradiště.
14–15 November – The 2015 Fed Cup final was hosted in Prague.

Film
26 February – Ghoul, horror film directed by Petr Jákl, was released in the Czech Republic.
5 July – Home Care, drama film directed by Slávek Horák, was released in the Czech Republic.

Deaths

6 January – Vlastimil Bubník, ice hockey and football player (born 1931) 
15 January – Ludmila Brožová-Polednová, state prosecutor (born 1921) 
15 January – Karel Lichtnégl, football player, Olympic silver medalist (born 1936)
20 January – Marie Pilátová, actress (born 1921)
19 March – Stanislav Prýl, ice hockey player (born 1942)
20 March – 
Petr Vopěnka, mathematician, developer of Alternative Set Theory (born 1935)
Josef Mikoláš, ice hockey player (born 1938)
28 March – Miroslav Ondříček, cinematographer (born 1934)
30 March – Štěpán Kodeda, orienteering competitor, complications after traffic accident (born 1988).
31 March – Dalibor Vesely, architectural historian (born 1934)
16 April – Stanislav Gross, Prime Minister (born 1969)
17 April – Jaroslav Holík, ice hockey player (born 1942)
20 April – Václav Rabas, organist (born 1933)
25 April – Jiří Hledík, football player (born 1929)
1 May – Karel Vasak, academic (born 1929)
10 May – Jindřich Roudný, Olympian (born 1924)
6 June – Ludvík Vaculík, writer (born 1926)
8 June – Otakar Hořínek, sport shooter, Olympic silver medallist (born 1929)
26 June – Kája Saudek, comics illustrator (born 1935)
29 June – Josef Masopust, footballer (born 1931)
1 July – Miloslava Misáková, gymnast, Olympic gold medallist (born 1922)
11 July – Ota Petřina, guitarist (born 1949)
19 July – Václav Snítil, violinist (born 1928)
27 July – Ivan Moravec, pianist (born 1930)
30 July – 
Ludmila Dvořáková, operatic soprano (born 1923)
Alena Vrzáňová, figure skater (born 1931)
20 August – Zuzana Brabcová, writer (born 1959)
1 September – Jiří Louda, heraldist (born 1920)
10 September – Radim Palouš, academic (born 1924)
2 October – Lubomír Lipský, actor (born 1923)
29 December – Pavel Srníček, football player (born 1968)

References

.

 
Years of the 21st century in the Czech Republic
Czech Republic